Fecampiida is an order of flatworms in the class Rhabditophora. It is a considerably recent clade, erected after molecular studies.

Description 
The order Fecampiida, as currently defined, was erected based on molecular studies. They all are parasitic organisms and are united by a similar development of the basal bodies during spermiogenesis.

Classification 
Three families of Fecampiida were initially classified in different flatworm orders: Urastomatidae and Genostomatidae were considered prolecithophorans, while Fecampiidae was considered a rhabdocoel. When the genus Notentera was discovered, its relationship with Fecampiidae was clear based on morphology, and both groups were united under Fecampiida. Further ultrastructural studies suggested that Urastomatidae and Genostomatidae were closely related to Fecampiidae and Notenteridae, which was confirmed by molecular studies.

Due to similarities in the protonephridial flame bulb, sperm and spermiogenesis, as well as the parasitic lifestyle, fecampiids were thought to be closely related to neodermatans, but molecular studies revealed them to be more closely related to triclads and prolecithophorans.

References 

Rhabditophora